Luciano Hang  ComMA(born 11 October 1962) is a Brazilian billionaire businessman, the co-founder of the Havan department store chain, which he owns nearly all of. Bloomberg LP have called him "a free-market evangelist and arguably Jair Bolsonaro's most passionate booster in the business community."

As of June 2019, Havan had 126 stores in 17 of the country's 26 states, with plans to reach 145 by the end of the year. Hang also owns hydro-electric power plants, gas stations, a real estate company and an investment fund.

2022 Brazilian general election 

On 23 August 2022, by order of the Supreme Federal Court, the Federal Police of Brazil carried out search and seizure warrants on the homes, offices and other properties of businessmen who allegedly supported a potential coup to support Jair Bolosnaro, including Hang, José Koury and José Isaac Peres, among others. The court also ordered a freeze in their bank and social media accounts, their testimonies, and access to their financial records, with the businessmen stating that this order constituted political persecution and an attack on their freedom of speech.

Personal life 
Hang is married to Andrea, they have three children, and live in Brusque, Santa Catarina, Brazil.

References

1962 births
Living people
Brazilian billionaires
Brazilian company founders
People from Brusque, Santa Catarina
Brazilian anti-communists

Brazilian people of German descent